Roller Hockey was introduced as a World Games sport for men at the 1981 World Games in Santa Clara. In 2005 it was replaced by Inline hockey.

Medalists

Men

Medal table

See also
Roller hockey at the Summer Olympics

External links
 Palmarès sur rink-hockey.net

 
Sports at the World Games
World Games
World Games